Algernon Greville (c. 1677 – 28 April 1720) was the second son of Fulke Greville, 5th Baron Brooke, son of Robert Greville, 2nd Baron Brooke, and his wife Sarah Dashwood.  He married Mary, daughter and coheir of Lord Arthur Somerset, the youngest son of Henry Somerset, 1st Duke of Beaufort. Their daughter, Mary (20 December 1713 – 1 March 1786), who married Shuckburgh Boughton (d. 1763) in 1736, had Sir Charles William Rouse Boughton, 1st and 9th Bt.
    
He served as member of Parliament for Warwick from 1699 to 1705 (with a short gap).  His son Fulke Greville represented Monmouth Boroughs from 1747 to 1752.

References

1677 births
1720 deaths
Younger sons of barons
Algernon
English MPs 1698–1700
English MPs 1701–1702
English MPs 1702–1705